Yemsa may refer to:
the Yemsa people
the Yemsa language